It Happened in Paris is a 1935 British romantic comedy film directed by Robert Wyler and Carol Reed, starring John Loder, Nancy Burne, and Esme Percy. The film marked Reed's directorial debut, and after working on this film with Wyler he was the sole director on his next film Midshipman Easy. The film is also notable for John Huston's contributions to the screenplay, and for the involvement of Reed, who is mentioned by some sources as having assisted and in others to have co-directed the film.

An American millionaire's son travels to France to study art, and falls in love in Paris.

Production
The film was made at Ealing Studios by the independent production company Wyndham Films. It is based on the play L'Arpete by Yves Mirande.

Plot 
Paul, artistically-inclined son of an American millionaire, moves to Paris where he can find inspiration and study the masters. While there, he finds inspiration of a different sort in the form of the beautiful Jacqueline.

Cast
 John Loder as Paul 
 Nancy Burne as Jacqueline 
 Edward H. Robins as Knight 
 Dorothy Boyd as Patricia 
 Esme Percy as Pommier 
 Minnie Rayner as Concierge 
 Lawrence Grossmith as Bernard 
 Bernard Ansell as Simon 
 Jean Gillie as Musette 
 Margaret Yarde as Marthe 
 Roy Emerton as Gendarme 
 Warren Jenkins as Raymond 
 Paul Sheridan as Baptiste  
 Kyrle Bellew as Ernestine 
 Arthur Burne as Minor Role
 Eveline Chipman as Mrs. Carstairs
 Greta Gynt as Minor Role 
 Bela Mila as Madame Renault 
 Dennis Val Norton as Roger 
 Nancy Pawley as Ernestine 
 Bill Shine as Albert

References

Bibliography
 Evans, Peter William. Carol Reed. Manchester University Press, 2005.
Low, Rachael. Filmmaking in 1930s Britain. George Allen & Unwin, 1985.
Wood, Linda. British Films, 1927–1939. British Film Institute, 1986.

External links
 

1935 films
1935 romantic comedy films
British romantic comedy films
Films set in Paris
Films set in France
Ealing Studios films
British films based on plays
Films with screenplays by John Huston
British black-and-white films
1930s English-language films
1930s British films